Nardò ( or) is a town and comune  in the southern Italian region of Apulia, in the Province of Lecce.

Lies on a lowland area placed at south-west of its Province, its border includes part of the Ionian coast of Salento. 

For centuries, it had been one of the central cities of the Byzantine Empire, until 1497, when the ducal House of Acquaviva acquired it under their domain. During those years it became the main cultural hotspot of Salento, seat of many Universities, Academies, literary and philosophical studies: it was given the name of Nuoua Atene litterarum.

With almost 32.000 inhabitants and 190 squared kilometres of land, it is the second largest and most populated city among those in the Province, right after Lecce, and also one of the most culturally active towns of Salento. The Old Town is particularly rich with palaces, churches, chapels and other architectural details shaped accordingly to the principles of Lecce's Baroque style. Indeed, the city is a significant example of this art movement along with Gallipoli and Lecce.  

The stretch of coast wet by the Ionian Sea is split into small inhabited fractions such as Santa Caterina, Santa Maria al Bagno, Sant'Isidoro and Porto Selvaggio. The latter is a Nature Reserve created by a reforestation that happened during 1950s.

Geography 
Part of Salento, Nardò is located in the north-western area of the province, by the Ionian Sea. The municipality borders with Avetrana (TA), Copertino, Galatina, Galatone, Leverano, Porto Cesareo, Salice Salentino and Veglie.

History

Traces of human presence in the area dates from Palaeolithic times. The settlement was founded by the Messapi around the year 1000 BC. The Romans conquered it in 269 BC and built the Via Traiana through it. After the fall of the Western Empire it was under the Byzantines and the Lombards.

In 1055 the Normans captured Nardò. Their heirs were ousted by the Angevines in 1266. In 1497 the Aragonese gave it to Andrea Matteo Acquaviva, whose son Belisario was the first Duke of Nardò, and promoted the Renaissance in the city.

In 1647 the city rebelled against the Spanish domination, but the viceroyal troops suppressed the riot with heavy terms.

Nardò DOC
The area around Nardò produces red and rose Italian DOC wines. The grapes are limited to a harvest yield of 18 tonnes/ha with the finished needing a minimum alcohol level of 12.5%. The wines are primarily composed of 80-100% Negroamaro with Montepulciano and Malvasia Nera permitted to fill in the remaining 20%.

Main sights
The Piazza Salandra is the center of the town.
Nardò Cathedral, built around 1000 AD. It has an 18th-century façade, but the interior has maintained the Romanesque-Gothic original appearance.
Church of San Domenico (16th-18th centuries). It has a highly decorated façade with Baroque caryatids, columns and vegetable figures.
Chiesa del Carmine, with a fine Renaissance portal.
Church of San Cosimo (1618)
Temple of the Osanna (1603)
Nardò Ring in Nardò is used as a test track for driving at high speeds.

People
Daniele Greco, triple jumper
Fabrizio Miccoli, footballer
Giuliano Sangiorgi, singer-songwriter

Sister cities
 Atlit, Israel
 Fiorano Modenese, Italy
 Conversano, Italy
 Gyumri, Armenia

In film
Nardò is the location of the Tomatina-inspired tomato festival in the 2014 British musical film, Walking on Sunshine.

See also
A.S.D. Nardò Calcio
Diocese of Nardò-Gallipoli

References

External links
 Official website
Views of the Baroque land of Nardò
Useful information and contacts about Nardò
How to get to Nardò
Puglia Photo Gallery
Nardò coast live webcam
 Salento 

 
Cities and towns in Apulia
Municipalities of the Province of Lecce
Localities of Salento
Baroque architecture in Apulia